An isomorphic keyboard is a musical input device consisting of a two-dimensional grid of note-controlling elements (such as buttons or keys) on which any given sequence and/or combination of musical intervals has the "same shape" on the keyboard wherever it occurs – within a key, across keys, across octaves, and across tunings.

Examples
Helmholtz's 1863 book On the Sensations of Tone gave several possible layouts.  Practical isomorphic keyboards were developed by Bosanquet (1875), Janko (1882), Wicki (1896), Fokker (1951), Erv Wilson (1975–present), William Wesley (2001), and Antonio Fernández (2009).  Accordions have been built since the 19th century using various isomorphic keyboards, typically with dimensions of semitones and tones. The keyboards of Bosanquet and Erv Wilson are also known as generalized keyboards. The keyboard of Antonio Fernández is also known as Transclado.

Invariance
Isomorphic keyboards can expose, through their geometry, two invariant properties of music theory:
 transpositional invariance, exposed in all isomorphic layouts by definition. Any given sequence and/or combination of musical intervals has the same shape when transposed to another key, and
 tuning invariance, only exposed in certain layouts like Wicki and Bosanquet. Any given sequence and/or combination of musical intervals has the same shape when played in another tuning of the same musical temperament.

Theory
All isomorphic keyboards derive their invariance from their relationship to rank-2 regular temperaments of just intonation. A two-dimensional lattice is generated by two basis vectors. A keyboard lattice generated by two given musical intervals, which are mapped to those basis vectors, is isomorphic with any rank-2 temperament that is also generated by those same two intervals. For example, an isomorphic keyboard generated by the octave and tempered perfect fifth will be isomorphic with both the syntonic and schismatic temperaments, which are both generated by those same two intervals.

Benefits
Two primary benefits are claimed by the inventors and enthusiasts of isomorphic keyboards:
 Ease of teaching, learning, and playing
 According to some authors, the invariance of isomorphic keyboards facilitates music education and performance. This claim has not been rigorously tested, so its validity has been neither proven nor disproven.
 Microtonality
 Isomorphic keyboards' provision of more than the usual 12 note-controlling elements per octave may facilitate the performance of music that requires more than 12 notes per octave.

A third potential benefit of isomorphic keyboards, dynamic tonality, has recently been demonstrated, but its utility is not proven. Using a continuous controller, a performer can vary the tuning of all notes in real time, while retaining invariant fingering on an isomorphic keyboard. Dynamic tonality has the potential to enable new real-time tonal effects such as polyphonic tuning bends, new chord progressions, and temperament modulations, but the musical utility of these new effects has not been demonstrated. One such keyboard that can do this is the Lumatone Isomorphic Keyboard.

Comparisons
The Dodeka keyboard has its keys arranged along a single direction, while most other isomorphic keyboards have their keys arranged in two dimensions. On the Harmonic and Gerhard keyboards, the two smallest intervals between a key and its six adjacent keys are a minor third (3 semitones) and a major third (4 semitones). On the Wiki-Heyden and Array Mbira, the smallest intervals are a major second (2 semitones) and perfect fourth (5 semitones). On the Park keyboard, the smallest intervals are a major second (2 semitones) and a minor third (3 semitones). On the Jankó keyboard, the smallest intervals are an augmented unison (1 semitone) and a major second (2 semitones).

Isomorphic keyboards can be compared and contrasted using metrics such as the thickness of an octave's swathe of buttons on the keyboard and the number of repetitions of a given note on the keyboard. Different isomorphic keyboards are suited for different uses; for example, the Fokker keyboard is well-suited to tunings of the syntonic temperament in which the tempered perfect fifth stays in a narrow range around 700 cents, whereas the Wicki keyboard is useful over both this and a much broader range of tunings.

See also
 Array mbira
 Chromatic button accordion
 Harpejji
 Wicki-Hayden note layout
 Dodeka Keyboard Design
 Harmonic table note layout

References

External links 

 Balanced Keyboard A modified symmetrical layout of the standard keyboard. The website shows how to build your own.
 Generalized Keyboard  papers of Erv Wilson
 Demo, Demonstration of the advantages of the isomorphic keyboard (Janko version) by Paul Vandervoort.  Program: "Kitten on the Keys" by Zez Confrey; explanation of the Janko note arrangement and advantages over a standard keyboard; demonstration of musical passages which are difficult or impossible to play on a standard keyboard; "C#-Major Prelude" from the Well-Tempered Clavier by J.S. Bach; Boogie-woogie rendition of "Bye Bye Blackbird".
 Dodeka Keyboard Another example of an isomorphic keyboard layout developed by Dodeka.
 クロマトーン　Inspiration 9:59 #1/11 played on the Chromatone (kuromatōn / クロマトーン), a Jankó-like isomorphic keyboard. The first in a series of 10 such "Chromatone Inspiration" videos.

 
Linear temperaments